KKJD may refer to:

 KKJD (FM), a radio station (91.3 FM) licensed to serve Borrego Springs, California, United States
 KKJD-LP, a defunct low-power radio station (99.1 FM) formerly licensed to serve Borrego Springs, California